Sir Arthur Norman Wolffsohn, CMG, OBE (30 September 1888 – 17 November 1967) was Speaker of the Legislative Assembly of British Honduras from 1954 to 1961.

References 
https://www.ukwhoswho.com/view/10.1093/ww/9780199540891.001.0001/ww-9780199540884-e-50716

1888 births
1967 deaths
Knights Bachelor
Companions of the Order of St Michael and St George
Officers of the Order of the British Empire
British Honduras politicians
British Honduras people
Surveyors